Caripeta is a genus of moths in the family Geometridae erected by Francis Walker in 1863.

Species
 Caripeta aequaliaria Grote, 1883
 Caripeta angustiorata Walker, 1863 – brown pine looper
 Caripeta aretaria (Walker, 1860)
 Caripeta canidiaria (Strecker, 1899)
 Caripeta divisata Walker, 1863 – grey spruce looper
 Caripeta hilumaria (Hulst, 1886)
 Caripeta interalbicans Warren, 1904
 Caripeta latiorata Walker, 1863
 Caripeta macularia (Barnes & McDunnough, 1916)
 Caripeta ocellaria (Grossbeck, 1907)
 Caripeta piniata (Packard, 1870) – northern pine looper
 Caripeta pulcherrima (Guedet, 1941)
 Caripeta suffusata Guedet, 1939
 Caripeta triangulata (Barnes & McDunnough, 1916)

References

Ourapterygini